Adventureland is an amusement park in East Farmingdale, New York, located on Route 110 (Broadhollow Road). Adventureland has been Long Island's main amusement park since 1962. There are a total of twenty eight rides, two of which are roller coasters and three are water rides. Adventureland is opened seasonally: weekends in March, April, May, September and October and all days in the summer. Alvin Cohen and Herb Budin bought seven acres of property in 1962 and opened a restaurant, an arcade and mini golf. Along with the building, there were four rides brought to Long Island for entertainment. The original four rides were the Carousel, the Iron Horse train, Little Dipper Coaster, and boats. Willy Miller bought Adventureland from Alvin Cohen on September 15, 1977. Throughout the years, Willy Miller brought in new rides and expanded Adventureland's activities. In 1987, the park was sold to Tony Gentile and Peter Amoruso. In 1991, they began to add water rides to Adventureland. Adventureland celebrated its 50th anniversary in 2012 and 60th anniversary in 2022. The park is a popular attraction for children, schools and day camps on Long Island.

History

1962–1987
As Long Island became more populated and developed, family entertainment was desired and many "kiddielands" were popping up throughout. After Alvin Cohen and Herb Budin visited a trade show in Chicago, they acquired a  site on Route 110 in Farmingdale, New York. They constructed a building which housed a restaurant and arcade, so the park could be open year-round. Along with the building, four rides opened outside: a carousel, Iron Horse train, Little Dipper coaster and boats. There was also a mini golf course. In 1962, the 1 million dollar park opened under the name of "Adventureland 110 Playland". As the park's success grew, the name was changed to "110 Adventureland".

In the early 1970s, the park was extremely successful partially due to the closure of Steeplechase Park and Freedomland U.S.A. in 1964 and Palisades Park a few years later. Alvin Cohen was now the primary owner of the facility and he bought an additional  behind the park for 1 million dollars. Over the next few seasons Cohen increased the ride count from 16 to 30. In 1973, three new thrill rides were built: the Toboggan (a compact roller coaster), the Amor Express (a high speed circular ride) and the Galaxy (a steel coaster). The next season brought on the Wave Swinger, a European-style spinning swings ride, one of the first of the kind in America. With the success of the Wave Swinger, Cohen decide to import more European rides, and in 1976 imported the Enterprise and Troika (both spinning rides). Cohen acquired these rides from Willy Miller, who owned a business importing European rides. Cohen saw Miller's interest in the park, and invited him to buy 110 Adventureland. Over the next two years they negotiated and finalized the sale on September 15, 1977.

In 1978, Miller bought several new rides, including an antique auto ride, which originally operated at the 1964 New York World's Fair and was designed by Arrow Development. In the first season under new management, profits increased 50%. Also, during this time Miller changed the name to just Adventureland. In 1979, Miller got a new Merry Go Round, a ride called Black Hole, and another ride called the Lost Continent. Then at the end of the 1982 season, Miller brought in the Looping Star, another European ride. Then, in 1983, Miller brought the UFO. Along with the UFO, Miller brought in six new rides replacing Enterprise and Troika. A new bumper car system and bumper boats were also added. In 1983, a ride called Gravitron replaced Black Hole; Miller also added a Bavarian Village with food outlets and stores. Over the next few years, brick walkways replaced blacktop, and the landscaping was done over. In 1986, the Lost Continent was changed into 1313 Cemetery Way, a haunted house ride.  In 2010, 1313 Cemetery Way was replaced with a new ride, The Ghost House.

New ownership

In 1987 Miller sold the park to Tony Gentile and Peter Amoruso (partners since 1978). The Gentile family and Amoruso kept park operation as normal while taking a major expansion. In this new era, Gentile added a huge new Pirate Ship, a ride called Scorpion and a mini golf course named "Treasure Island."

As the 1990s dawned, customers of Adventureland wanted more water rides. Gentile and Amoruso opened Splish Splash (sold in the late 1990s to Palace Entertainment), a 6 million dollar water park. Then, in 1991, the Galaxy was replaced by Hurricane, a roller coaster. New rides were regular through the 1990s. In 1992, Super Raider, a climbing/fun house was opened. Then, the next year, the antique car ride was updated, the Scorpion ride was switched with Surf Dance, Tubs of Fun and Flying Clowns replaced older kiddie rides. Then, in 1995, the Balloon Wheel replaced the Big Wheel. In 1996, the Dragon Wagon replaced the Sooper Jet, a kiddie roller coaster. Then, in 1999, a double decker merry go round replaced the old merry go round. In 2000, a child roller coaster called the Lady Bug was built. In 2001, the mini golf course was replaced with Adventure Falls, a log flume water ride. Top Scan was introduced to the park in 2003, and the next year, Viking Voyage replaced the last original ride, the Kiddie Boats. Then, in 2004 a Spinning alligator water ride called Crocodile Run replaced the Bumper Boats. In 2006, a kiddie log flume called Little Dipper was added where the Top Scan used to be and the Frisbee was added where Surf Dance was. In 2007, they also added a "Glass House" (a.k.a. "Mirror House") to where some of their games were and also bought all of the outside games and updated them.  Two years later, the ride Flying Puppies replaced Tubs of Fun. In 2010, a new Haunted House, imported from Europe, was added to the park in place of the former Haunted House.

50th anniversary and 2012–present
For the 50th anniversary, 2012, the train station was moved to the former area of the Glass House. The old train station became a Wi-Fi lounge/patio for people to eat and relax. The Super Raider was also retired and Pirate Island, a similar type of ride was added. In addition, the back ticket booth was remodeled. In 2013, the Free Whale and John Silver's tower did not return. They were replaced with Alfie's Express, a small "farm train" type kiddie ride and "Surf's Up", a moderate thrill kiddie ride, both manufactured by SBF rides. The Kiddie Swings were also replaced with a newer model, named "Alfie's Swings". Also in 2013, a stage was built across from the Bavarian Village Gift Shop and a charging station next to City Hall. Many locations throughout the park were updated with energy efficient LED lighting, most notably the train station. At the end of the 2013 season, the Flying Puppies and Tour De Paris were closed. On select night's throughout October, Adventureland was host to an exclusive fundraising event, called Nightmare on the Midway. The haunted Halloween event featured four haunted attractions, live actors and multiple scare zones. At the beginning of the 2014 season, two new attractions were opened: NYC race and the Teacups, both made by SBF. A VIP parking car port with solar panels was built in the back parking lot. The lights on Wave Swing were updated with LED technology. A second Charging station was opened near the pirate ship and rear entrance of the park. The new Turbulence coaster, which replaced the Hurricane, opened on May 22, 2015. A new thrill ride called Mystery Mansion replaced the Ghost House and the drop N' Twist in 2018.

Rides and attractions

Thrill rides

Family rides

Kiddie rides

Water rides

Games

Balloon Bust 
Topspin
Frog Bog
Goblet Toss
Highstriker 
Long Range Basketball 
Ring Toss
Rising Water
Rope Climb 
Short Range Basketball
Stinky Feet 
Whac-A-Mole
Whopper Water

Attractions
Arcade

Former rides and attractions

Mini Golf Course (1962–1987)
Original Carousel (1962–1999)
Kiddie Boats (1962–2003)
Little Dipper Roller Coaster (1962–)
Jolly Caterpillar (1965–2001)
Skyliner (1965–1981)
Toboggan (1973–1979)
Galaxy (1973–1991)
Enterprise (1976–1983)
Troika (1976–1983)
The Lost Continent (1979–1986)
Black Hole (1979–1983)
Looping Star (1982–2003)
Sooper Jet (1982–1996)
The Gravitron (1983-)
The UFO (1983–)
Bumper Boats (1983–2004)
Original Bumper Cars (1983–2017)
1313 Cemetery Way (1986–2010)
Scorpion (1987–1993)
Treasure Island Mini Golf (1987–2001)
The Hurricane (1991–2014)
Super Raider (1992–2012)
Surf Dance (1993–2006)
Tubs of Fun (1993–2009)
Dragon Wagon (1996–)
The Ladybug (2000–2019)
Top Scan (2003–2005)
Tour De Paris (2003–2013)
Crocodile Run (2004–2019)
Flying Puppies (2009–2013)
The Ghost House (2010–2018)
Big Wheel (–1995)
Free Whale (–2013)
John Silver's Tower (–2013)
Drop N Twist Tower (–2017)
Flower Jet
Granny Bugs
Paratrooper
Moon Taxi
Tilt-A-Whirl
Skooters
Space Age
Parachute Drop
1001 Nights
Recording Studio
Video Studio
Kinder Carousel
Satellites
Original Helicopters
Balloon Tower
Kiddie Carousel (2000-2021)

Accidents
Two unrelated deaths occurred within a week of each other in the summer of 2005. The first victim was an 18-year-old ride operator for the "Paul Bunyon" (Ladybug Coaster). The man was struck by the coaster car and died the next morning due to internal injuries. The second incident involved a 45-year-old woman on a ride called the "Top Scan" (which replaced the "Looping Star"). She was propelled from the spinning ride and crashed into a parked car in the parking lot. The ride was never used again at Adventureland.

In 2007, a 6-year-old boy lost his balance on the mechanical walkway on the "Super Raider" attraction and fell over, jamming his right hand between a wall and the walkway. While freeing himself, he partially severed his right hand.

In 2008, a prop of a skeleton unicycling on a tight rope fell on a 5-year-old girl. She was in the hospital for 3 days and then was released.  The prop was never put back up after the incident.

In popular culture
Adventureland was in the music video Love of a Lifetime by Chaka Khan.
Adventureland was also featured in the movie Music and Lyrics in 2007.
Adventureland was also shown in the movie Sweet Liberty in 1986.
The 2009 film Adventureland was based on writer and director Greg Mottola's experiences working there during his youth.
Scenes from the season 2 premiere of The Americans were filmed at Adventureland.
Scenes from the 2017 film Good Time were filmed at Adventureland.
Scenes from the final episode of Unbreakable Kimmy Schmidt were filmed at Adventureland.
Scenes from the first episode of Succession were filmed at Adventureland.
Advertisement for Daniel "Keemstar" Keem's Cotton Candy G Fuel Flavor was filmed at Adventureland.
 The music video for the Sheira & Loli's Dittydoodle Works song "Bonkyloo" was filmed at Adventureland.
 As a stage in The King of Fighters '97.
 Girl Tech commercials were filmed at Adventureland.
 The Long Man 2: LOST IN NEW YORK has two scenes filmed inside Adventureland.
Scenes from the 1982 film "Beach House" were filmed at Adventureland by Producer Marino Amoruso, Nephew of Adventureland partner Peter Amoruso.
Commercials for Jordache Jeans in 1983 were filmed at Adventureland.

Notes

References
 Official website

 New York Amusement Park, by Jim Futrell

Amusement parks in New York (state)
1962 establishments in New York (state)
Babylon (town), New York
Amusement parks opened in 1962